Sisu (Callsign OHMW) is a Finnish icebreaker of the  built in 1976 in Helsinki.

Her sister, is nearly identical. Sisu has accommodations fitted with classrooms for maritime students. Urhos accommodations are reserved for public relations uses.

References
 SISU - IMO 7359656 - Callsign OHMW - ShipSpotting.com
 Sisu ARCTICA Oy

External links

 

Icebreakers of Finland
Ships built in Helsinki
1976 ships
Atle-class icebreakers